The Order of Nikola Šubić Zrinski is the 9th most important medal given by the Republic of Croatia. The order was founded on April 1, 1995. The medal is awarded for a heroic act in war or imminent danger of war, or exceptional circumstances in peace. It is named after the ban of Croatia Nikola IV Zrinski.

See also
Orders, decorations, and medals of Croatia

References 

Orders, decorations, and medals of Croatia
Awards established in 1995
1995 establishments in Croatia